The Wrights may refer to:
 The Wrights (Australian band)
 The Wrights (country duo)